Software as a product (SaaP, also programming product, software product) is a product, software, which is made to be sold to users, and users pay for licence which allows them to use it, in contrast to SaaS, where users buy subscription and where the software is centrally hosted.

One example of software as a product has historically been Microsoft Office, which has traditionally been distributed as a file package using CD-ROM or other physical media or is downloaded over network. Office 365, on the other hand, is an example of SaaS, where a monthly subscription is required.

Development effort estimation 
In the book The Mythical Man-Month Fred Brooks tells that when estimating project times, it should be remembered that programming products (which can be sold to paying customers) are three times as hard to write as simple independent in-house programs, because requirement to work on different situations, which increases testing efforts and as a documentation.

See also 
 The Mythical Man-Month
 Minimum viable product
 Product manager
 Software as a service

Literature

References 

Software distribution